John William "Tim" Grosser (born 29 August 1942) is an Australian former cricketer. He played two first-class matches for New South Wales in 1968/69.

See also
 List of New South Wales representative cricketers

References

External links
 

1942 births
Living people
Australian cricketers
New South Wales cricketers
People from Gunnedah
Cricketers from New South Wales